Operation Crackers was a British Commando raid during the Second World War. 
The raid from the 23 February to the 3 March 1943 at Sognefjord in Norway, consisted of 16 men drawn from No. 10 (Inter-Allied) Commando, No. 12 Commando and No. 30 Commando. The original object of the raid was to attack an observation post and take a look at another, rough seas prevented this, so instead an observation post was manned for a week undetected, gathering information.

References

Conflicts in 1943
World War II British Commando raids
Battles and conflicts without fatalities
1943 in Norway
C
Amphibious operations involving the United Kingdom